The Coleraine–Portrush line is a short branch railway line in Northern Ireland between the town of Coleraine in County Londonderry and the seaside resort of Portrush in County Antrim. The line, which is operated by Northern Ireland Railways, has two intermediate halts and connects to the main Belfast–Derry line at Coleraine.

Current services
Monday to Friday, first 2 trains from Portrush are through trains to Great Victoria Street then the rest of the day an hourly service operates to Coleraine and Portrush

On Saturdays the first train from Portrush is a through train to Great Victoria Street; then the rest of the day an hourly service operates to Coleraine and Portrush

On Sunday, there is an hourly service to Portrush and Coleraine, and with the service extending to Great Victoria Street every two hours.

Monday to Sunday all passengers for Castlerock, Belarena and Londonderry must change at Coleraine

History
The line was built as part of the Ballymena, Ballymoney, Coleraine and Portrush Junction Railway, authorised in 1853. The engineer was Charles Lanyon and the contractor and major sponsor of the line was William Dargan. It was opened in 1855. In 1860, a junction with the Derry line was made at Coleraine, leaving the line from there to the terminus at Portrush as a branch.

Winter services were suspended from 1960, but opening of the New University of Ulster near Coleraine saw them restored, together with the addition of new halts at University (1968) and Dhu Varren (1969), to cater for student travel.

The intermediate station for Portstewart (via the Portstewart Tramway) was located at Cromore and closed in 1964. This station then reopened in 1968 but closed again in 1988.

References

1855 establishments in Ireland
1988 disestablishments in Northern Ireland
Railway lines opened in 1855
Railway lines closed in 1988
Railway lines in Northern Ireland
Transport in County Antrim
Transport in County Londonderry
Coleraine
Portrush